Makhado (also: Makhato or Makgato, c.1839 – 3 September 1895) was a 19th-century chief (or khosi) in the Singo (or Vhasenzi) dynasty of the Vendas. They ruled over the Dzanani "district" of the Zoutpansberg region of South Africa. He was the youngest son of khosi Ramabulana who died in 1864 when Makhado was about 25. Makhado's mother was Limani, noted for her political intrigue. Makhado's first wife was Nwaphunga. According to Venda historian M. H. Nemudzivhadi, Nwaphunga conspired with a pro-Boer faction among the Venda, and poisoned him in 1895.

Accession 
Limani was the daughter of the khosi of Tshitavhadulu. He intended her to become the new great wife of Ramabulana's younger brother Ramavhoya, then khosi, after her sister's passing. With the voortrekker Louis Tregardt's assistance, Ramabulana was able to overthrow Ramavhoya (who earlier had unseated him) and took the option to marry Limani.

Genealogy
 Thohoyandou the Great 
 Munzhedzi Mpofu (khosi at Tshirululuni till 1829)
 Rasithu (also known as: Rasethau, Ramabulana, Ramapoelana, Munzhedzi and Ravele), ruled c.1830 and 1836–1864), Ramavhoya (ruled c.1830–1836) and Madzhie were sons of Mpofu
 Davhana and Makhado were sons of Ramabulana
 Maemu Malise, Alilali Tshilamulela (Mphephu I, or M'pefu), Sinthumule and Kutama were sons of Makhado
 Mbulaheni George (Mphephu II)
 Ramaano Patrick (Mphephu III, 1924–1988), president of Venda bantustan (1979–1988)
 Tshimangadzo (Dimbanyika Thohoyandou II) and Toni (Mphephu Ramabulana)

References

Venda people
Monarchies of South Africa
1895 deaths
People from Limpopo
Year of birth uncertain